Rev. Delores L. McQuinn (born November 26, 1954 in Henrico County, Virginia) is an American politician of the Democratic Party. On January 6, 2009 she was elected to the Virginia House of Delegates, representing the 70th district, made up of parts of Chesterfield and Henrico Counties and the city of Richmond. She was previously a member of the Richmond City Council.

Personal life
McQuinn studied at Virginia Commonwealth University and Virginia Union University. She  an associate minister at Mount Olivet Baptist Church in Richmond.

Political career
McQuinn was a member of the Richmond School Board 1992–96, serving as vice chair.

McQuinn was elected to the Richmond City Council in a special election on April 6, 1999, replacing Leonidas B. Young, II, who resigned in February, and Sherwood T. White, an interim appointment. She served as Vice-Mayor 2003–2004 and Vice-President of the Council 2007–2008.

When Delegate Dwight Clinton Jones was elected Mayor of Richmond in November 2008, McQuinn ran for the Democratic nomination for his 70th district House seat. She defeated lawyer Carlos Brown for the nomination, and was unopposed in the general election on January 6, 2009.

In the 2017 election, McQuinn faced a primary challenge from Alex Mejias.

McQuinn serves as the Chair of the Transportation Committee and as a member of the Education, Appropriations, and Rules. She also serves as the Chair of the Elementary and Secondary Subcommittee and as a member of the Compensation and General Government Subcommittee, Transportation and Public Safety Subcommittee in the Appropriations Committee. Additionally, McQuinn serves as a member of the Pre-K-12 Subcommittee in the Education Committee.

See also
2009 Virginia House of Delegates election

Notes

References

External links

1954 births
Living people
Democratic Party members of the Virginia House of Delegates
Richmond, Virginia City Council members
Virginia Commonwealth University alumni
Virginia Union University alumni
Women state legislators in Virginia
Women city councillors in Virginia
21st-century American politicians
21st-century American women politicians